Opole University of Technology (Polish name: Politechnika Opolska; sometimes called  in English Technical University of Opole) is a university located in Opole, Poland.

The university was founded in 1959 as a consultative branch of Silesian University of Technology. In 1966 it became an independent university known as Wyższa Szkoła Inżynierska w Opolu (Higher School of Engineering in Opole). The name Politechnika Opolska (Opole University of Technology) is used since 1996.

The university has over 500 lecturers and over 9000 students. There are seven faculties:

 Faculty of Civil Engineering and Architecture
 Faculty of Mechanical Engineering
 Faculty of Electrical Engineering, Automatic Control and Computer Science
 Faculty of Physical Education and Physiotherapy
 Faculty of Economics and Management
 Faculty of Production Engineering and Logistics
 Faculty of Technical Systems Engineering

In 2008, the Opole University of Technology in Cooperation with the Beijing University of Technology have opened the Opole Confucius Institute.
Centre for Cooperation Poland-China Confucius Institute is a non-profit public utility institution whose mission is promoting Chinese language and culture. The Institute is working for the benefit of this University and the Opole local community. The Opole Centre is one of the 200 such offices in the world associated in an international web, whose principal office Hanban (Office of Chinese Language Council International) is situated in Beijing.

The Opole University of Technology is also an individual full member of the European University Association (EUA). The European University Association (EUA) represents and supports higher education institutions in 46 countries, providing them with a unique forum to cooperate and keep abreast of the latest trends in higher education and research policies.

External links 
 Official website of the University
 Department of Electrical Engineering, Automatic Control and Computer Science
 Faculty of Civil Engineering
 Faculty of Mechanical Engineering
 Department of Mechanics and Machine Design
 Opole Confucius Institute

Opole
Universities and colleges in Opole
Universities and colleges in Poland
1966 establishments in Poland